The Croatia men's national tennis team represents Croatia in the Davis Cup and is governed by the Croatian Tennis Association. It is captained by Vedran Martić.Croatia won the Davis Cup twice, in 2005 and 2018, and was runner-up in 2016 and 2021.

History

Croatia competed in its first Davis Cup in 1993 in Europe/Africa Group I semifinals beating Zimbabwe 3–2. In 1994 Croatia beat Portugal 4–0 in qualification round thus ensuring its first time appearance in World Group in 1995. Croatia lost in its debut from Germany and failed to qualify in the World Group again until 2002 where they beat Germany and earned its first quarterfinals. In 2005 Croatia won its first Davis Cup over Slovakia as the first unseeded nation to win the title, and also reached No. 1 at the ITF rankings for the first time. Croatia reached semifinals in 2009 but lost to Czech Republic 4–1. In 2016 Croatia reached the finals for the second time, again as unseeded nation, but lost to Argentina. Two years later, in 2018, Croatia won its second title by beating defending champion France, thus becoming the last Davis Cup champion in the old best-of-five competition format, and also the 10th country overall with more than one title.

Current team
The following players were called up for the 2023 Davis Cup qualifying round in February 2023.

Players

Managers

Davis Cup finals

List of matches
Here is the list of all match-ups since 1993, when Croatia started competing as a separate nation.

1990s

2000s

2010s

2020s

Statistics
''Last updated: Croatia – Austria ; 5 February 2023

Record
Champion: 2 times (2 times Away)
Runner-up: 2 times
Lost in Semifinals: 1 time
Lost in Quarterfinals: 5 times
Lost in First Round: 7 times
Not in World Group: 10 times
World Group Play-off: 8–5; Total Play-off: 9–6 
Performance at home: 21–9 (70.0%)
Performance away: 18–14 (56.2%)
Performance neutral: 4–3 (57.1%)
Total: 46–28 (62.2%)

Head-to-head record (1993–)

Record against continents

Record by decade
2020–2029: 9–3 (75.0%) 
2010–2019: 13–10 (56.5%) 
2000–2009: 17–7 (70.8%)
1993–1999: 6–8 (42.9%)

Has never played against 10 countries which, at one point or another, played in the World Group: Belarus, Cuba, Indonesia, Israel, Mexico, New Zealand, Paraguay, Peru, South Korea, Switzerland.

See also
Croatia at the Hopman Cup
Croatia Fed Cup team
World Team Cup

Notes

References

External links

Davis Cup teams
Davis Cup
Davis Cup
Davis Cup